The abdominal aortic plexus (not to be confused with the thoracic aortic plexus) is formed by branches derived, on either side, from the celiac plexus and ganglia, and receives filaments from some of the lumbar ganglia.

It is situated upon the sides and front of the aorta, between the origins of the superior and inferior mesenteric arteries.

From this plexus arise part of the spermatic, the inferior mesenteric, and the hypogastric plexuses; it also distributes filaments to the inferior vena cava.

The abdominal aortic plexus contains the spermatic ganglia, the inferior mesenteric ganglion, and the prehypogastric ganglion.

Additional images

References

External links
 

Nerve plexus
Nerves of the torso